Vincenzo Periti (1564 – 19 August 1618) was a Roman Catholic prelate who served as Bishop of Lavello (1615–1618).

Biography
Vincenzo Periti was born in San Felice, Italy in 1564.
On 18 May 1615, he was appointed during the papacy of Pope Paul V as Bishop of Lavello.
On 28 May 1615, he was consecrated bishop by Giovanni Garzia Mellini, Cardinal-Priest of Santi Quattro Coronati with Ascanio Gesualdo, Archbishop of Bari-Canosa, and Giovanni Battista del Tufo, Bishop Emeritus of Acerra, serving as co-consecrators. 
He served as Bishop of Lavello until his death on 19 August 1618.

References

External links and additional sources
 (Chronology of Bishops) 
 (Chronology of Bishops) 

17th-century Italian Roman Catholic bishops
Bishops appointed by Pope Paul V
1564 births
1618 deaths